Reggae Gold 2013 is a compilation reggae album from VP Records. It was released on July 23, 2013 and Reggae Gold is an annual series from VP Records beginning in 1992. The set begins with rap-star-turned-Rastafarian Snoop Lion's reggae-influenced sound on "Lighter's Up" featuring vocals from Kingston's Mavado and rising star Popcaan and then Major Lazer's "Jah No Partial" with Jamaican vocalist Johnny Osbourne. Reggae Gold 2013 features the talents of Beres Hammond & Shaggy, Gyptian, Konshens, Major Lazer featuring Johnny Osbourne and Snoop Lion featuring Mavado & Popcaan among others.

The first disc featured the recent hits, including Shaggy featuring Beres Hammond’ “Fight This Feeling”, Major Lazer’s “Jah No Partial”, Busy Signal’s “You and Me”, Gyptian’s “Wine Slow”, Sean Paul’s “Body”, Konshens “Bad Girl”, Snoop Lion’s “Lighters Up”, I-Octane’s “Gal Gimmie Bun”, Angela Hunte’s “One Shot” and more.

The second disc is a selection of classic hits from the past years. Disc 2 featured artists are: Ini Kamoze, Half Pint, Yellowman, Shabba Ranks, Red Rat, General Degree,  Barrington Levy, Desmond Dekker, Bounty Killer and more. Reggae Gold 2013 landed second place on the Billboard Reggae Album chart

Track listing

Disc 1

Disc 2

References

2013 compilation albums
Reggae compilation albums